This is the filmography of the American actor, director, producer and activist Robert Redford.

Redford gained prominence for his leading roles in the romantic comedy Barefoot in the Park (1967) opposite Jane Fonda and the western Butch Cassidy and the Sundance Kid (1969) alongside Paul Newman. He reunited with Newman in the 1973 caper film The Sting receiving his only nomination for the Academy Award for Best Actor. He continued his leading man status starring in the western film Jeremiah Johnson, the political drama The Candidate (both 1972), the romantic dramas The Way We Were (1973), and The Great Gatsby (1974), and the dramas Three Days of the Condor, and The Great Waldo Pepper (both 1975). The following year he starred as Bob Woodward in the Alan J. Pakula political drama All the President's Men (1976). He later appeared in the Richard Attenborough war film A Bridge Too Far (1977), and Sydney Pollack western comedy The Electric Horseman (1979). 

He further established himself as a star in the Barry Levinson sports drama The Natural (1984) and the Sydney Pollack epic romance Out of Africa (1985). He continued appearing in films such as Sneakers (1992), Indecent Proposal (1993), The Horse Whisperer (1998), An Unfinished Life (2005), All is Lost (2013), A Walk in the Woods (2015), Peter's Dragon (2016), and The Discovery (2017). In 2014 he entered the Marvel Cinematic Universe appearing as Alexander Pierce in Captain America: Winter Soldier (2014), a role he would reprise in Avengers: Endgame (2019). In 2015 portrayed Dan Rather in the drama Truth (2015). He reunited with Jane Fonda in the Netflix romance Our Souls at Night (2017), and The Old Man & the Gun (2018).

In 1980 he made his directorial film debut with Ordinary People for which it won the Academy Award for Best Picture with Redford receiving the Academy Award for Best Director. He continued directing films such as  A River Runs Through It (1992), Quiz Show (1994), The Legend of Bagger Vance (1998), Lions for Lambs (2007), The Conspirator (2010), and  The Company You Keep (2012). In 2002 he received the Academy Honorary Award as an "Actor, director, producer, creator of Sundance, inspiration to independent and innovative filmmakers everywhere."

Actor

Film

Television

Director

Producer 
with Wildwood Enterprises, Inc

Narrator 

From 2002 to 2018, Redford has narrated The New Environmentalists, a PBS series about grassroots activists around the globe.

References

External links 
 

Male actor filmographies
American filmographies